Forūghī, also transliterated as Foroughi, Forooghi and Furūghi, is a popular Persian surname. Notable people with the surname include:

Mohammad-Ali Foroughi, prominent Iranian politician and scholar of the first half of the 20th century
Mohammad-Hoseyn Foroughi, Iranian author and translator and the father of Mohammad-Ali Foroughi
Abolhasan Foroughi, Iranian educator and author and younger brother of Mohammad-Ali Foroughi
Mohsen Foroughi, pioneer of modern architecture in Iran, famous collector of Persian and Iranian antique art, and son of  Mohammad-Ali Foroughi
Abbas Foroughi Bastami, 19th-century Persian poet
Fereydun Foroughi, Iranian singer
Kamal Foroughi, British-Iranian businessman currently imprisoned in Iran

See also
 Forough, a given name